Utricularia laxa is a small to medium-sized annual carnivorous plant that belongs to the genus Utricularia. It is endemic to South America and is found in Argentina, Brazil, Paraguay, and Uruguay. It was originally described and published by Augustin Saint-Hilaire and Frédéric de Girard in 1838.

See also 
 List of Utricularia species

References 

Carnivorous plants of South America
Flora of Argentina
Flora of Brazil
Flora of Paraguay
Flora of Uruguay
laxa
Plants described in 1838